The Filth is a comic book limited series, written by Grant Morrison and drawn by Chris Weston and Gary Erskine. It was published by the Vertigo imprint of American company DC Comics in 2002.

Publication history
The Filth was Grant Morrison's second major creator-owned series for Vertigo after The Invisibles. Initially starting as a Nick Fury proposal for Marvel Comics, Morrison adapted it as a 13-part series for Vertigo. The title refers both to the police (in British slang) and to pornography (in which Morrison "immersed" themselves while "researching" the series). Morrison has said that the series is their favorite among their works.

Plot
The series tells the story of Greg Feely, a bachelor whose main interests are his cat and masturbating to pornography. Feely is actually a member of a shadowy organization called The Hand and their attempts to keep society on the path to the "Status Q".

Themes and motifs
The Filth can be seen partly as a companion piece to The Invisibles in that it touches upon similar themes and concepts such as fractal realities, art affecting life, postmodern blurring of the fourth wall and the world as a single, living organism with humans as the cells that compose it. Morrison has stated that they had originally intended to make The Filth a thematic sequel to The Invisibles, followed by a third comic book series, The Indestructible Man. Morrison later concluded that their original Flex Mentallo series formed the first in the trilogy. Therefore, the sequence runs: 1. Flex Mentallo. 2. The Invisibles, 3. The Filth. The theme of The Filth consists of immersion into, and eventual redemption from, the forces of negativity.

Synopsis

Greg Feely is a "dodgy bachelor" living in London alone but for his elderly cat, Tony. While returning home after buying cat litter and a pornographic magazine from a newsagents, an unknown woman on the bus tells him "not to fuck with The Filth". The next day after work he is told "The Hand never lets go" by the same mysterious woman. Returning home he is confronted by a strange woman named Miami Nil who informs him that "Greg Feely" is actually a "para-personality", in effect a secret identity, and he is in fact Ned Slade, the top agent for an organisation called The Hand, a group of extra-dimensional agents attempting to keep society on the path of "Status Q" (status quo).

After telling his "replacement" to take care of his cat, Slade and Miami travel to The Hand's headquarters. Slade is told by his superior officer, the enigmatic Mother Dirt, that he has been brought back to help maintain "Status Q", and to ensure that Slade's friend and former agent Spartacus Hughes fails in his attempts to disrupt the "Status Q". Slade sets out to stop Hughes from helping a perverted billionaire control a new form of life called I-Life (created to become a new immune system for humans). With the aid of Miami and Comrade Dmitri-9, a misanthropic former Russian chimpanzee cosmonaut and assassin, Slade confronts Hughes and manages to distract him so that Dmitri-9 can shoot him.

Slade returns to The Hand headquarters to find answers to what is going on. Receiving no answers, Slade quits to be Greg Feely again and take care of ailing Tony. The Hand sends Dimitri-9 to bring Feely/Slade back. After telling Feely's replacement to make sure he cares properly for Tony (which does not happen), Slade meets Doctor Arno Von Vermin, another officer of The Hand. They travel to another dimension where their vehicle crashes, forcing them to walk across a bizarre landscape to find a way to Hand headquarters. Slade discovers Von Vermin to be an 'anti-person': one who can endanger the Status Q. Slade leaves Von Vermin to drown in his own recycled urine and sets out to reach Hand headquarters on foot.

Slade's next mission involves Anders Klimakks, a Dutch male porn star who is found by Los Angeles police wandering naked with a bag containing fifty pornographic magazines and DVDs. The police call in The Hand to interrogate Klimakks. Klimakks reveals to Hand Officer Jenesis Jones that he has no memories before he began life as a porn star in his native Amsterdam before coming to Los Angeles to work for pornographer Tex Porneau (based upon real life porn director Max Hardcore). Porneau is after Klimakks' semen, which is strangely jet-black. After being seduced by Klimakks, Jones informs Hand headquarters that Klimakks is an anti-person. Slade and his team are called in to investigate, just as Porneau is transforming his latest batch of prisoners into rubber-clad servants. Upon arriving, Slade is confronted with  giant mutant sperm, which Porneau has created as a weapon to kill any woman with a fertile womb. Slade's team manage to kill Porneau but not before hundreds are killed. Dimitri-9 shoots and kills Klimakks. Klimakks is killed for being an anti-person, but he lives on in the children of the 824 women he had sex with.

Slade returns to being Greg Feely just in time to find his cat Tony's health has worsened due to his doppelganger's abusive neglect. Before he can call the vet, he is arrested by the police who suspect him of being a paedophile due to surrealist pictures of children with ant heads found in his garbage. Slade denies he is a paedophile, saying that the pictures are just experiments with photoshop. Slade/Feely escapes after injuring his police interrogators. While escaping the police Slade/Feely finds a tampon in a puddle with the words "help us" written in blood on it. After being arrested again, Slade's team from The Hand appears and tell the police to release him. The Hand informs him that renegade former Hand operative Spartacus Hughes has declared war on the U.S. after kidnapping the US President who is on board a gigantic city ship called the "Libertania". Slade and his team board the ship and find that Hughes has turned the innocent passengers on "Libertania" into violent anti-people who destroy their ship for Hughes's amusement. Hughes has also involuntarily grafted female breasts onto the president and brainwashed him into behaving like a prostitute. Slade confronts Hughes and while being told by Hughes that he decided to become an anti-person after seeing "too much dirt" during his days with The Hand, the President and Hughes are killed by Dmitri-9.

Slade returns to being Greg Feely again but finds his replacement has allowed his cat Tony to die. Feely returns to being Slade and is taken on a tour of The Hand by Officer Cameron Spector in order for Slade to find some answers to his questions. After a confrontation with Max Thunderstone, the world's first super hero, Slade returns to being Feely and beats his doppelganger for letting his cat die. Upon returning home, he finds Sharon Jones, a young British businesswoman who had witnessed the fall of the I-Life. After bringing Tony back, she reveals that "Sharon" is dead, and the I-Life are manning her body as a "bio-ship". Feely finds out that it is Slade who is the fake personality and has been all along and that other operatives are also all artificial "parapersona" biochemical implants in vials. After this discovery, Feely is classed as an anti-person and a now psychotic and deranged Dmitri-9 is sent to kill Feely. However, Dimitri kills Feely's replacement by mistake and the real Feely attacks Dmitri-9. As he is being attacked Feely's neighbours storm his home and Dmitri-9 escapes into the street to be beaten and thrown in front of a speeding train. His body is torn apart by the impact and only his hand remains, giving the finger to an unseen audience, consisting of hallucinations of early US chimpanzee experimental astronauts.

Miami Nil reports to her superior, Officer Mandrill (a woman whose upper torso is inexplicably swarming with extra mammaries), and claims that had they been more careful with Tony the cat, Feely would have adapted to the Slade persona. Mandrill replies that they will have to hunt Feely down; now that they have taken back Spartacus Hughes and adapted his persona, he is their professional hunter, and his abilities have increased upon being placed within the new body of Max Thunderstone.

Feely returns to the newsagents, discovering that it leads to a Hand storehouse - a room in which millions of alphabetized parapersonas are shelved. Officers Spector and Mercury try to convince him to come back, only for him to give them a startling revelation: their Hand personas are parapersonas. Whenever the Hand needs a new agent, they pick up an innocent bystander and make them into the new Slade. Enraged and bitter, he declares death to Status Q. Before he can begin he is stopped by Spartacus Hughes, who has broken into Slade's apartment, and raped and killed "Sharon Jones". The rejuvenated and reanimated Tony is missing. Spartacus Hughes nearly kills Feely before Spector saves his life. Feely and Spector escape and Thunderstone dies by dropping into the polluted and acidic "Sour Milk" sea surrounding The Hand's headquarters.

Spector is killed after exposure to accelerated ageing; the area around the Hand's base is temporally anomalous and ages a person by several years, and Spector formerly had six months to live due to aggressive lymph cancer. Feely snaps her neck to spare her from her suffering and death agonies. Back in his house, Feely writes in his journal that no-one believes him; they claim that he killed Tony with neglect and made up the whole "Hand" fiasco to cope. The police come to his door just as his deliberate overdose of painkillers kicks in; his journal states that he was beginning to believe the Police himself, even as he sees the unutterable truth. The Hand Organisation is not part of some dystopian future; it is actually a third of a centimetre high, erected on a mess of food spilled outside his fridge. Hand agents are not sent to another place, but are thrown back in time and shrunk. The reason that the environment of the Hand's base ages people is because they are living years in the space of seconds. The Giant Hand and Pen which the Organisation focuses on is Feely's own.

At the beginning of the final chapter, Feely, breaks into Hand Headquarters carrying a Thermovolver. The storytelling here is non-linear and takes place before Feely's attempted suicide. He kills several people, including those who mix the Parapersonas, reveals to Miami that he never had any feelings for her, and unmasks LaPen, revealing her to be a young, disfigured African woman who was raped and immolated in Chad. At the center of the Hand base, Feely confronts Mother Dirt, who is a super-intelligent mass of compost-like material. She tells him that the selection process for her agents is ruthless but necessary to maintain the Status Q. He was always meant to have a special role within The Hand, just not what he had been led to believe at first. She offers him a part of herself, claiming that she must be spread upon his flowers. In subsequent panels, the flowers seem to have unusually vivid colour amidst the washed-out tones of the final pages of the series.

Surviving his suicide attempt back in his real life, Feely refuses offers to rejoin a new version of The Hand, but Feely continues to work for the Hand. He reveals that the I-Life saved him from suicide after Sharon Jones died. He now serves in a benign role, using the I-Life (who have further evolved into intelligent beings vaguely resembling Vulcans) to heal people he comes into contact with, such as a bedridden quadriplegic.

The final page depicts Greg entering an underpass, presumably to find the reincarnated Tony, whom he has contacted via their shared I-Life, resulting in the internal message "We have love".

Collected editions
A trade paperback of all 13 issues was released in 2004.

See also
The Invisibles
Flex Mentallo

Notes

References

Sources

External links

Grant Morrison homepage
Curing the Postmodern Blues, a book by Tom Shapira on the series (has unpublished art by Weston and interviews with Morrison, Weston, and Erskine)
Crack Comics-companion site to Morrison's homepage
The Filth discussed at ninthart.com (via archive.org)
Grant Morrison interview at popthought.com
Filth Review at PopImage

2002 comics debuts
Comics by Grant Morrison
Fictional law enforcement agencies
Vertigo Comics titles